"Happy Trails" is a song by Roy Rogers and wife Dale Evans, known as the theme song for the 1940s and 1950s radio program and the 1950s television show in which they starred. It was written by Evans and always sung by the duo over the end credits of those programs.

"Happy Trails" was released in 1952 as a 78 RPM and 45 RPM by Rogers and Evans with the Whippoorwills and Orchestra, on RCA Victor Records. It was re-issued in 1957 as a 45 RPM record on RCA Victor/Bluebird. Members of the Western Writers of America chose it as one of the Top 100 Western songs of all time.

Foy Willing's version
In 1951, Foy Willing had written a song titled "Happy Trails" for the Republic Pictures movie, Spoilers of the Plains, starring Roy Rogers with Foy Willing and the Riders of the Purple Sage.  Subsequently, the first three notes of Foy's song and the title were used by Dale Evans in writing her version of "Happy Trails" for both the original The Roy Rogers Show and the short-lived The Roy Rogers and Dale Evans Show, which aired on ABC in 1962.  Dale's is the version that is popularly played and sung today, albeit without giving credit to Foy Willing.

Cover versions 

There have been numerous notable covers of Dale Evans' version of the song. For example:
 Quicksilver Messenger Service released an album called Happy Trails (1969), on which the song appears.
 On October 1, 1970, Janis Joplin left a taped recording of the song as a birthday greeting for John Lennon, three days before her death.  Lennon, whose birthday was October 9, later told Dick Cavett that her taped greeting arrived at his home after her death.
 Van Halen covered the song, a cappella in four-part harmony, as the closing track for their album, Diver Down (1982).  The band usually ended live performances with their first lead singer, David Lee Roth, with that song.
 Randy Travis covered the song with Rogers on his album, Heroes & Friends (1990).

References

External links

Children's television theme songs
Television drama theme songs
Radio theme songs
Western music (North America)
1951 songs
Roy Rogers songs
Children's songs
RCA Victor singles
Male–female vocal duets